Madeline Elizabeth Duggan (born 28 June 1994) is a British actress, known for her portrayal of Lauren Branning in the BBC soap opera EastEnders from 2006 to 2010.

Career
In 2003, Duggan portrayed the role of Little Cosette in a production of Les Misérables at the Palace Theatre, London. She then played the lead role in two short films; Amanda in Between Us (2004), and Ellie in Spoilt Eggs (2006). Duggan first appeared on screen as Lauren Branning in the BBC soap opera EastEnders on 3 July 2006. She was dropped from the series in May 2010 by executive producer Bryan Kirkwood, and was replaced by Jacqueline Jossa.

In October 2011, it was announced that she would be starring in the feature film Everyone's Going To Die. In 2016, Duggan had a minor role in The Tunnel.

In April 2020 she revealed that she was now working part-time in a doctor's surgery because "being an out of work actress doesn't pay".

In 2020 amid the COVID-19 crisis Duggan joined a supergroup of celebrities called The Celebs which includes Frank Bruno and X Factor winner Sam Bailey to raise money for both Alzheimer's Society and Action for Children. They recorded a new rendition of Merry Christmas Everyone by Shakin' Stevens and it was released digitally on 11 December 2020, on independent record label Saga Entertainment. The music video debuted exclusively on Good Morning Britain the day before release. The song peaked at number two on the iTunes pop chart.

Filmography

References

External links
 
 

1994 births
English child actresses
English film actresses
English musical theatre actresses
English soap opera actresses
Living people
People from Bermondsey
21st-century English actresses